The National Maritime Museum (NMM) is a maritime museum in Greenwich, London. It is part of Royal Museums Greenwich, a network of museums in the Maritime Greenwich World Heritage Site. Like other publicly funded national museums in the United Kingdom, it has no general admission charge; there are admission charges for most side-gallery temporary exhibitions, usually supplemented by many loaned works from other museums.

Creation and official opening
The museum was created by the National Maritime Museum Act 1934 under a Board of Trustees, appointed by HM Treasury. It is based on the generous donations of Sir James Caird (1864–1954). King George VI formally opened the museum on 27 April 1937 when his daughter Princess Elizabeth accompanied him for the journey along the Thames from London. The first director was Sir Geoffrey Callender.

Collection

Since the earliest times Greenwich has had associations with the sea and navigation. It was a landing place for the Romans, Henry VIII lived here, the Navy has roots on the waterfront, and Charles II founded the Royal Observatory in 1675 for "finding the longitude of places". The home of Greenwich Mean Time and the Prime Meridian since 1884, Greenwich has long been a centre for astronomical study, while navigators across the world have set their clocks according to its time of day. The museum has the most important holdings in the world on the history of Britain at sea comprising more than two million items, including maritime art (both British and 17th-century Dutch), cartography, manuscripts including official public records, ship models and plans, scientific and navigational instruments, instruments for time-keeping and astronomy (based at the Observatory). Its holdings including paintings relating to Vice-Admiral Horatio Nelson and Captain James Cook.

An active loans programme ensures that items from the collection are seen in the UK and abroad.

The museum aims to achieve a greater understanding of British economic, cultural, social, political and maritime history and its consequences in the world today. The museum plays host to various exhibitions, including Ships Clocks & Stars in 2014, Samuel Pepys: Plague, Fire, Revolution in 2015 and Emma Hamilton: Seduction and Celebrity in 2016.

The collection of the National Maritime Museum also includes items taken from the German Naval Academy Mürwik after World War II, including several ship models, paintings and flags. The museum has been criticized for possessing what has been described as "looted art". The museum regards these cultural objects as "war trophies", removed under the provisions of the Potsdam Conference.

The museum awards the Caird Medal annually in honour of its major donor, Sir James Caird.

In late August 2018, several groups were vying for the right to purchase the 5,500  relics that were an asset of the bankrupt Premier Exhibitions. Eventually, the National Maritime Museum, Titanic Belfast and Titanic Foundation Limited, as well as National Museums Northern Ireland, joined together as a consortium that was raising money to purchase the 5,500 artifacts. The group intended to keep all of the items together as a single exhibit. The oceanographer Robert Ballard said that he favoured this bid as it would ensure that the memorabilia would be permanently displayed in Belfast (where the Titanic was built) and in Greenwich. The museums were critical of the bid process set by the Bankruptcy Court in Jacksonville, Florida. The minimum bid for the auction on 11 October 2018 was set at US$21.5 million (£16.5m) and the consortium did not have enough funding to meet that amount.

The site

The gardens immediately to the north of the museum were reinstated in the late 1870s following construction of the cut-and-cover tunnel between Greenwich and Maze Hill stations. The tunnel comprised part of the final section of the London and Greenwich Railway and opened in 1878.

A full redevelopment of the main galleries, centring on what is now the Neptune Court, which was designed by Rick Mather Architects and funded by the Heritage Lottery Fund, was completed in 1999.

In 2008, the museum announced that the Israeli shipping magnate Sammy Ofer had donated £20m for a new gallery.

For a year between 2016 and 2017 the National Maritime Museum reported 2.41 million visitors.

Directors of the National Maritime Museum

1937–1946: Geoffrey Callender
1947–1966: Frank George Griffith Carr
1967–1983: Basil Jack Greenhill
1983–1986: Neil Cossons
1986–2000: Richard Louis Ormond CBE (born 1939)
2000–2007: Rear Admiral Roy Clare (born 1950)
2007–2019: Dr Kevin Fewster
2019–present: Paddy Rogers

Caird Medal

The Caird Medal was instituted in 1984 to mark the fiftieth anniversary of the National Maritime Museum Act 1934 that established the museum. The medal is awarded annually to "an individual who, in the opinion of the Trustees of the National Maritime Museum, has done conspicuously important work in the field of the Museum's interests and is of a nature which involves communicating with the public." The medal is named for Sir James Caird (1864–1954), the principal donor at the founding of the National Maritime Museum.

Caird Medallists

 1984: Eric McKee
 1985: Michael S. Robinson
 1987: Jules van Beylen
 1989: C. R. Boxer
 1990: Helen Wallis
 1991: John F. Coates and John Sinclair Morrison
 1992: Richard Ollard
 1993: Gerard L. E. Turner
 1994: Glyndwr Williams
 1995: Margaret Rule
 1996: John de Courcy Ireland
 1997: Felipe Fernández-Armesto
 1998: Elly Dekker
 1999: Elisabeth Mann-Borgese
 2000: John Hattendorf
 2002: Robert Ballard
 2004: Sir David Attenborough
 2005: Paul Kennedy
 2006: David Armitage
 2007: Martin Rees, Baron Rees of Ludlow
 2010: Willem F. J. Mörzer Bruyns
 2011: Daniel A. Baugh
 2014: R. J. B. Knight
 2015: Simon Schaffer

Other British maritime museums 

The National Maritime Museum Cornwall is a fully independent museum, a development of the original FIMI (Falmouth International Maritime Initiative) partnership created in 1992 and the result of collaboration between the National Maritime Museum, Greenwich and the former Cornwall Maritime Museum in Falmouth.

See also 
 Britain and the Sea
 British Maritime Charitable Foundation
 Greenwich Visitor Centre
 List of history awards
 List of London museums
 National Historic Fleet
 National Waterways Museum—the UK's national museum of inland waterway transport
 Het Scheepvaartmuseum (Netherlands Maritime Museum)

References

External links

 
 The official prints website of the National Maritime Museum containing a selection of the museum's finest images
 National Maritime Museum Photostream (many photos labelled "no known copyright restriction") at Flickr.com

Museums in the Royal Borough of Greenwich
Grade I listed buildings in the Royal Borough of Greenwich
Grade I listed museum buildings
Transport museums in London
Archives in the Royal Borough of Greenwich
Art museums and galleries in London
Maritime museums in England
Naval museums in England
History museums in London
Science museums in London
World War I museums in the United Kingdom
World War II museums in the United Kingdom
Marine art museums
Museums established in 1937
Exempt charities
Charities based in London
Maritime history organizations